Marliana is a comune (municipality) in the Province of Pistoia in the Italian region Tuscany, located about  northwest of Florence and about  west of Pistoia.

The church of St. Nicholas, known from 1373, houses two statuettes attributed to Benedetto Buglioni.

Marliana borders the following municipalities: Massa e Cozzile, Montecatini Terme, Pescia, Pistoia, San Marcello Piteglio, Serravalle Pistoiese.

References

Cities and towns in Tuscany